Allan Bolton is a New Zealand former professional darts player.

Darts career
Bolton won the 2005 Alan King Memorial Men's Singles Champions.

He won the 2007 New Zealand National Championships and won himself a place in the 2008 PDC World Darts Championship. He was beaten 5–0 in the preliminary round by Erwin Extercatte.

Bolton quit the PDC in 2011.

World Championship results

PDC
 2008: Last 68 (lost to Erwin Extercatte 0–5) (legs)

External links
Profile and stats on Darts Database

Living people
Year of birth missing (living people)
New Zealand darts players
Professional Darts Corporation associate players
20th-century New Zealand people
21st-century New Zealand people